Thiepane is the organosulfur compound with the formula (CH2)6S. Thiepanes are seven-membered ring heterocycles that contains sulfide. The parent thiepane has seldom been studied.  

A variety of derivatives are known.  Hexathiathiepane (CAS RN 17233-71-5, m.p. 90 °C) is CH2S6.  A naturally occurring derivative is lenthionine, 1,4-(CH2)2S5.

Thiepane (hexathiophane) itself may be a product of spontaneous coal fires in post-mining waste heaps.

Reference

Sulfur heterocycles
Seven-membered rings